Chobata is a monotypic moth genus of the family Noctuidae. Its only species, Chobata discalis, is found in the Dominican Republic. Both the genus and species were first described by Francis Walker in 1858.

References

Acontiinae
Monotypic moth genera